Dendrobium lineale is a species of orchid. They last two to three months and bloom throughout the year in the native habitat.

Characteristics 
Dendrobium lineale is a sympodial orchid with cane-like pseudobulbs. It was previously known as Dendrobium veratrifolium, and was one of the earliest to be taken overseas from Papua New Guinea for use in hybridising. Flower petals vary in colour, including pink, blue, yellow, purple and white. Usually they are white with a purple veined lip. The petals are half-twisted or not twisted at all, with the tips rounded or blunt, and the lip midlobe oblong with a wavy margin. Size also varies depending on the location at which they originate. For example, on the Sepik River and its tributaries, plants are sturdy, flowers have little colour on the lip and are smaller than the pristine white sepals and purple labellum elsewhere; while on Wulai Island in Kimbe Bay, the flowers are again smaller, on inflorescences half the size of those on the mainland, with petals creamy white, thick and shiny. Other varieties include 'Karkar Island Pink', 'Jawani Island Yellow', 'Kui Island Blue' and 'Morobe Shower'.

References

External links 

lineale
Orchids of New Guinea
Orchids of Papua New Guinea
Flora of Western New Guinea
Epiphytic orchids
Plants described in 1889